Peter Spears (born November 29, 1965) is an American actor and filmmaker. He was born in Kansas City, Missouri, and raised in Overland Park, Kansas. Spears is best known for winning an Oscar for producing Nomadland at the 93rd Academy Awards ceremony in 2021. The film also won the BAFTA, Golden Globe, PGA Award, and the Golden Lion at the 2021 Venice Film Festival. Spears also produced the critically acclaimed 2017 film Call Me by Your Name, and was nominated for the Academy Award for Best Picture. He directed the underground cult-favorite short film Ernest and Bertram, which portrayed Sesame Street characters Bert and Ernie as gay lovers in a loose parody of Lillian Hellman's The Children's Hour. Spears also developed the television series Nightmare Café and John from Cincinnati.

Career 
In 2020, Spears founded his own production company, Cor Cordium. The company has multiple projects in development across film and television, including the upcoming Bones and All, which reunites Spears with filmmaker Luca Guadagnino and Timothée Chalamet.

In addition to his career as a film director and producer, Spears is also an actor, having appearing in films such as Call Me By Your Name, Something's Gotta Give, The Opposite of Sex, and Father of the Bride Part II, as well as several television series, including Friends and E.R. He was most recently seen in the film Sublet, directed by Eytan Fox.

Spears also co-founded OutSet: The Young Filmmakers Project, a collaboration between the Outfest Film Festival and the Los Angeles LGBT Center. The 6-month film lab selects a group of diverse 16-to-24-year-old emerging filmmakers to share their stories through film, by embarking on courses in screenwriting, pre-production, production and post-production, mentored by industry experts. The program culminates in the filmmakers' final thesis projects presented at the Outfest Los Angeles LGBTQ Film Festival.

Personal life 
Spears is married to talent agent Brian Swardstrom, and the couple splits their time between upstate New York and California.

Filmography

As actor

Film

Television

As writer

As director

As producer

Film

Television

References

External links 
 

1965 births
Living people
20th-century American Jews
20th-century American male actors
20th-century American LGBT people
21st-century American Jews
21st-century American male actors
21st-century American LGBT people
American film producers
American gay actors
American male film actors
American male television actors
Film producers from Kansas
Film producers from Missouri
Film producers from New York (state)
Filmmakers who won the Best Film BAFTA Award
Golden Globe Award-winning producers
Jewish American male actors
LGBT Jews
LGBT people from Missouri
LGBT people from New York (state)
LGBT producers
Male actors from Kansas
Male actors from Kansas City, Missouri
Male actors from New York City
Northwestern University alumni
People from Overland Park, Kansas
People from Rancho Mirage, California
Producers who won the Best Picture Academy Award